Chipping Sodbury railway station was a railway station on the South Wales Main Line serving the town of Chipping Sodbury in Gloucestershire.

The station opened on 1 July 1903, and closed on 3 April 1961.

References

External links 

 Chipping Sodbury station on navigable 1946 O.S. map

Disused railway stations in Bristol, Bath and South Gloucestershire
Former Great Western Railway stations
Railway stations in Great Britain opened in 1903
Railway stations in Great Britain closed in 1961